Nehzatabad (also Romanized as Nehẕatābād; also known as Shāhābād) is a village in Nehzatabad Rural District, in the Central District of Rudbar-e Jonubi County, Kerman Province, Iran. In the 2006 census, its population was 785 individuals and 149 families.

References 

Populated places in Rudbar-e Jonubi County